Gobio lingyuanensis is a species of gudgeon, a small freshwater in the family Cyprinidae. It is found in the Dalinhe, Lanhe, and Shonghuajiang rivers in China.

References

 

Gobio
Fish described in 1934
Taxa named by Tamezo Mori
Freshwater fish of China